Jesper Christiansen (born 18 June 1980) is a Danish professional footballer, who plays for Danish 2nd Division East club FC Svendborg. He previously played for Danish clubs and in England and Scotland.

His father Mogens Christiansen played for Odense Boldklub in the 1970s and 1980s.

References

1980 births
Living people
Danish men's footballers
Footballers from Odense
Odense Boldklub players
Kidderminster Harriers F.C. players
Scottish Premier League players
Dunfermline Athletic F.C. players
Kolding FC players
Randers FC players
Danish Superliga players
English Football League players
Danish expatriate men's footballers
Expatriate footballers in England
Expatriate footballers in Scotland
Danish expatriate sportspeople in England
Danish expatriate sportspeople in Scotland
FC Fredericia players
SfB-Oure FA players

Association football forwards